Pietro Venier (died 8 May 1372) was a Governor of Cerigo.

Ancestry
He was a son of Marco Venier, fl. in 1347 and 1363, and wife Caterina ..., paternal grandson of Pietro Venier (died bef. 1360) and wife Bonafemena Quirini, and great-grandson of Marco Venier, Lord of Cerigo, and wife.

Marriage and issue
He married ... and had Francesco Venier (died 1424), who married his cousin Fantina Venier, daughter of Pietro Venier and wife, but died childless.

References

 Ancestry of Sultana Nur-Banu (Cecilia Venier-Baffo)

1372 deaths
Pietro
Year of birth unknown
Kythira
14th-century Italian nobility